Muktuk (transliterated in various ways, see below) is a traditional food of the peoples of the Arctic, consisting of whale skin and blubber. It is most often made from the bowhead whale, although the beluga and the narwhal are also used. It is usually consumed raw, but can also be eaten frozen, cooked, or pickled.

Methods of preparation 

In Greenland, muktuk (mattak) is sold commercially to fish factories, and in Canada (muktaaq) to other communities.

When chewed raw, the blubber becomes oily, with a nutty taste; if not diced, or at least serrated, the skin is quite rubbery.

One account of a twenty-first century indigenous whale hunt describes the skin and blubber eaten as a snack while the rest of the whale meat is butchered (flensed) for later consumption. When boiled, this snack is known as unaaliq. Raw or cooked, the blubber and skin are served with HP sauce, a British sweet and sour condiment. Muktuk is occasionally finely diced, breaded, deep fried, and then served with soy sauce.

Nutrients and health concerns 
Muktuk has been found to be a good source of vitamin C, the epidermis containing up to 38 mg per . It was used as an antiscorbutic by British Arctic explorers. Blubber is also a source of vitamin D.

Proceedings of the Nutrition Society stated in the 1950s that:

Contaminants from the industrialised world have made their way to the Arctic marine food web. This poses a health risk to people who eat "country food" (traditional Inuit foodstuffs). As whales grow, mercury accumulates in the liver, kidney, muscle, and blubber, and cadmium settles in the blubber, the same process that makes mercury in fish a health issue for humans. Whale meat also bioaccumulates carcinogens such as PCBs, chemical compounds that damage human nervous, immune and reproductive systems, and a variety of other contaminants.

Spellings
Transliterations of "muktuk", and other terms for the skin and blubber, include:
Ikiilgin, Chukchi
Maktaaq (ᒪᒃᑖᖅ), Siglitun, Kivalliq, Aivilik, North Baffin, East Baffin, South Baffin
Maktak (ᒪᒃᑕᒃ), Inupiat, Siglitun, North Baffin
Maktaq, Inuinnaqtun, Natsilingmiutut (Inuvialuktun)
Mattak, Labrador, Greenland
Mangtak, Alaskan Yup'ik
Mungtuk, Siberian Yupik
Kimaq, Alutiiq/Sugpiaq

In some dialects, such as Inuinnaqtun, the word muktuk refers only to the edible parts of the whale's skin and not to the blubber.

See also
Nalukataq, spring whaling festival
Marine mammals as food
Chukchi cuisine

References

External links

 

Inuit cuisine
Chukchi cuisine
Yakut cuisine
Whale dishes
Animal fat products
Canadian cuisine